Milies (Greek: Μηλιές) may refer to several places in Greece:

Milies, a municipal unit in Magnesia
Milies, Euboea, a village in Euboea
Milies, Elis, a village in Elis